ABI family member 3 binding protein is a protein that in humans is encoded by the ABI3BP gene.

References

Further reading